Mercer Ridge is a prominent, partly ice-free ridge that forms the southwest end of Mount Schopf in the Ohio Range of the Horlick Mountains, Antarctica. It was named by the Advisory Committee on Antarctic Names after glacial geologist John H. Mercer (1922–87), a member of the Ohio State University expedition to the Horlick Mountains in 1960–61. He returned to work in the Horlick Mountains in 1964–65, and later worked with the Institute of Polar Studies (now the Byrd Polar Research Center), Ohio State University, in the Antarctic, Alaska, Greenland, Argentina, Chile, and Peru over the period 1966–87.

References

Ridges of Marie Byrd Land